Eretmocera impactella is a moth of the  family Scythrididae. This species is known from Oman, United Arab Emirates, India, Sri Lanka, Taiwan and Thailand and Pakistan.

Description
The forewings are blackish brown with more or less distinct whitish or white yellowish markings.

Biology
The larvae feed on various Amaranthaceae species and other food plants.

Gallery

References

External links

 boldsystems.org:  Pictures of this species

impactella
Invertebrates of the Arabian Peninsula
Moths described in 1864